In geometry, a polyhedron is a solid in three dimensions with flat faces and straight edges. Every edge has exactly two faces, and every vertex is surrounded by alternating faces and edges. The smallest polyhedron is the tetrahedron with 4 triangular faces, 6 edges, and 4 vertices. Named polyhedra primarily come from the families of platonic solids, Archimedean solids, Catalan solids, and Johnson solids, as well as dihedral symmetry families including the pyramids, bipyramids, prisms, antiprisms, and trapezohedrons.

Polyhedra by vertex count 
Notes: Polyhedra with different names that are topologically identical are listed together.  Except in the cases of four and five vertices, the lists below are by no means exhaustive of all possible polyhedra with the given number of vertices, but rather just include particularly simple/common/well-known/named examples.  The "Counting Polyhedra" link below gives the exact number of distinct polyhedra with n vertices for small values of n.

References

External links
 
 Counting Polyhedra